Leesville Township is a township in Henry County, in the U.S. state of Missouri.

Leesville Township was established in 1873, taking its name from the community of Leesville, Missouri.

References

Townships in Missouri
Townships in Henry County, Missouri